Thomas Sprengers (born 5 February 1990) is a Belgian cyclist, who currently rides for UCI ProTeam .

Major results

2008
 1st  Team pursuit, National Junior Track Championships (with Tosh Van der Sande, Alphonse Vermote & Simon Verhamme)
 3rd Grand Prix Général Patton
2011
 1st Mountains classification Tour de Liège
2012
 1st Overall Tour de Liège
 1st Stage 3 Tour de Moselle
 3rd Overall Tour d'Eure-et-Loir
1st Stage 4
 7th Circuit de Wallonie
2014
 1st Mountains classification Circuit de la Sarthe
 5th Rund um den Finanzplatz Eschborn-Frankfurt
 10th Cholet-Pays de Loire
 10th Coppa Ugo Agostoni
2015
 3rd Tour de Vendée
 8th Overall Tour du Limousin
 10th Overall Tour du Gévaudan Languedoc-Roussillon
2016
 9th Overall Tour du Limousin
2017
 5th Circuito de Getxo
 9th Rund um Köln
 10th Overall Tour de Wallonie
2018
 8th Overall Tour de Luxembourg
 9th Brabantse Pijl
 10th Grand Prix d'Isbergues
2020
 6th Paris–Chauny
 7th Trofeo Serra de Tramuntana
2021
 1st  Sprints classification Vuelta a Andalucía

References

External links

1990 births
Living people
Belgian male cyclists
Sportspeople from Leuven
Cyclists from Flemish Brabant
21st-century Belgian people